Brahim Ghali (born 19 August 1949) is a Sahrawi politician, military officer and current president of the Sahrawi Arab Democratic Republic (SADR), formerly its ambassador to Algeria and Spain.

Ghali played a key role in the struggle of the Sahrawi people for self-determination and independence from Morocco. He was instrumental in the creation of the Movement for the Liberation of the Saguia el Hamra and Wadi el Dhahab, the 1970 Zemla Intifada against Spanish rule, the foundation of the Popular Front for the Liberation of Saguia el-Hamra and Río de Oro (Polisario Front) in 1973, and the Sahrawi Republic in 1976. He also played a major role in the Western Sahara War and establishment of MINURSO, the UN peacekeeping mission for the Western Sahara.

Early life
Ghali was born in Smara on 16 September 1949 (although other sources claimed he was born in Bu Craa). Ghali joined the Spanish-led Nomadic Troops in the late 1960s and was subsequently dispatched to Smara for administrative work. After several meetings with Mohamed Bassiri and other Sahrawi political leadership, they decided to create the AOLS in 1969, with Ghali being the affiliation secretary of the organization. He participated in the AOLS demonstration held in El Aaiun on 16 June 1970, which passed to be known as the Zemla Intifada. Detained that same night by Spanish soldiers, he was sentenced to one year in prison for his political activities. He was freed in 1971 but was briefly detained again in 1972 for taking part in demonstrations.

Political career 
Ghali was one of the original founders and leaders of the Polisario Front in 1973 and was elected as the first General Secretary of the movement at its constitutive congress. Alongside El Uali Mustapha Sayed, Ghali led the El-Khanga raid, the first military action of the POLISARIO against a desert post of the Spanish Army, overrunning the position and gathering weapons and equipment. In 1974, as El Uali was elected as the new POLISARIO General Secretary, Ghali was selected to command the Sahrawi People's Liberation Army, its military wing.

On 22 October 1975, Ghali, El Uali, and Mahfoud Ali Beiba met General Federico Gómez de Salazar, the Spanish governor of the territory on the first official encounter between representatives of the Spanish government and the POLISARIO. Negotiations broke off shortly thereafter, with Ghali do not attending another meeting with Gómez de Salazar on 29 October, while the Spanish government declared a curfew on El Aaiun.

On 4 March 1976, he was designated as the defense minister of the first government of SADR, proclaimed in Bir Lehlou on 27 February. He remained in that post until 1989 when he was chosen as Commander-in-chief of the Second Military Region.

At an election held on 9 July 2016, in the Sahrawi refugee camps in Tindouf, Ghali was chosen as the next President and Secretary-General of SADR. Ghali replaced longtime leader Mohamed Abdelaziz, who died on 31 May 2016. Ghali paid a presidential visit to the Nigerian President, President Mohammadu Buhari on Thursday, 13 June 2019, at the villa in Abuja, Nigeria.

A complaint was filed against Ghali in 2013 for the alleged rape and sexual abuse of Khadijatou Mahmoud Mohamed Zoubeir. In addition, the ASADEDH filed a lawsuit against him in Spain for alleged torture. The ASADEDH was criticized as its chairman, Ramdane Messaoud, is a member of the Moroccan Royal Advisory Council for Saharan Affairs. Provisionally dismissed, the lawsuits were reopened after Ghali's arrival to Spain in 2021 to recover from a critical health state due to COVID-19. Then, on 19 May 2021, the Spanish Audiencia Nacional summoned him to testify as a defendant in the case presented by the ASADEDH and Fadel Breica; Ghali testified via videoconference from the Hospital San Millán-San Pedro in Logroño as he was recovering from COVID-19 on 1 June 2021. Judge  determined the accusing parties had not brought any evidence whatsoever (not even indicative) hinting at Ghali's culpability.

Ghali was re-elected as president and Secretary-General of SADR on 20 January 2023, obtaining 1,253 congressmembers' votes to opponent Bachir Mustafa Sayed's 563. A total of 54 votes were invalid and 227 members were absent. At this time, Ghali's vote percentage was the lowest of any winning Sahrawi presidential candidate, while Mustafa Sayed's was the highest for any non-winning candidate.

References

1949 births
Living people
Ambassadors of the Sahrawi Arab Democratic Republic to Algeria
African socialists
African democratic socialists
Sahrawi rebels
Sahrawi nationalists
People from Smara
Polisario Front politicians
Presidents of the Sahrawi Arab Democratic Republic
Sahrawi Sunni Muslims
Muslim socialists
Members of the Reguibat tribe